Being Human may refer to:

Books 
 Being Human novels, a 2010 trilogy based on the British TV series
 Being Human, a 2011 poetry anthology by Neil Astley
 Being Human, a 2017 photo book by William Wegman
 Being Human: Bodies, Minds, Persons, a 2018 book by Rowan Williams
 Being Human: The Problem of Agency, a 2000 book by Margaret Archer

Film and television 
 Being Human (1994 film), a 1994 film starring Robin Williams
 Being Human (2005 film), a 2005 film
 Being Human (British TV series), a 2008–2013 BBC Three supernatural drama series
 Being Human (North American TV series), a 2011–2014 North American remake

Other uses 
 Being Human (album), a 1999 album by Michael Peterson
 Being Human Foundation, an Indian charity for education and healthcare
 The human condition, or the unique features of being human
 Being Human, one of the galleries of the Wellcome Collection

See also 
 Human Being (disambiguation)